The Juno Award for International Album of the Year is an annual award given to a non-Canadian album. It has been given out since 1975. It was formerly known as Best Selling Album (Foreign or Domestic) (1993–2002), Best Selling Album by a Foreign Artist (1992), International Album of the Year (1981–1991), and Best Selling International Album (1975–1980). Thus, the rules have changed slightly over the years. (Céline Dion, a Canadian won in 1999, 1997 & 1995 and Bryan Adams, also a Canadian won in 1993.)

Presently, the nominees are based on sales (i.e. the five best-selling non-Canadian albums of the year), and therefore do not necessarily represent the year's "best" international albums. However, the ultimate winner of the award is determined by vote of the CARAS board of directors.

Winners

Best Selling International Album (1975 - 1980)
 1975 - Paul McCartney and Wings, Band on the Run
 Various Artists, American Graffiti
 Elton John, Goodbye Yellow Brick Road
 John Denver, John Denver's Greatest Hits
 1976 - Elton John, Greatest Hits
 Paul McCartney and Wings, Venus and Mars
 Pink Floyd Wish You Were Here
 Cat Stevens, Greatest Hits
 Freddy Fender, Before the Next Teardrop Falls
 1977 - Peter Frampton, Frampton Comes Alive!
 Charley Pride, The Best of Charley Pride Vol. 3
 Paul McCartney and Wings, Wings over America
 Chicago, Chicago IX: Chicago's Greatest Hits
 Nazareth, Greatest Hits
 1978 - Fleetwood Mac, Rumours
 Stevie Wonder, Songs in the Key of Life
 Boston, Boston
 Elvis Presley, Elvis: A Collector's Edition
 Barbra Streisand, A Star Is Born
 1979 - Bee Gees, Saturday Night Fever
 Rod Stewart, Foot Loose & Fancy Free
 Various Artists, Grease
 Meat Loaf, Bat Out of Hell
 Fleetwood Mac, Rumours
 1980 - Supertramp, Breakfast in America
 Rod Stewart, Blondes Have More Fun
 The Knack, Get the Knack
 Boney M., Nightflight to Venus
 Bee Gees, Spirits Having Flown

International Album of the Year (1981 - 1991)
 1981 - Pink Floyd, The Wall
 Bob Seger, Against the Wind
 Kenny Rogers, Greatest Hits
 Queen, The Game
 1982 - John Lennon & Yoko Ono, Double Fantasy
 Pat Benatar, Crimes of Passion
 Barbra Streisand, Guilty
 REO Speedwagon, Hi Infidelity
 Stars on 45, Stars on Long Play
 1983 - Men at Work, Business as Usual
 Foreigner, 4
 The J. Geils Band, Freeze Frame
 Royal Philharmonic Orchestra, Hooked on Classics
 Olivia Newton-John, Physical
 1984 - The Police, Synchronicity
 Lionel Richie, Can't Slow Down
 Culture Club, Colour by Numbers
 ZZ Top, Eliminator
 David Bowie, Let's Dance
 1985 - Bruce Springsteen, Born in the U.S.A.
 Madonna, Like a Virgin
 Wham!, Make It Big
 Tina Turner, Private Dancer
 Prince, Purple Rain
 1986 - Dire Straits, Brothers in Arms
 ZZ Top, Afterburner
 Heart, Heart
 Various Artists, Miami Vice
 John Cougar Mellencamp, Scarecrow
 1987 - Madonna, True Blue
 Eurythmics, Revenge
 Bon Jovi, Slippery When Wet
 U2, The Joshua Tree
 Various Artists, Top Gun
 1989 - Various Artists, Dirty Dancing
 Michael Jackson, Bad
 Various Artists, Cocktail
 George Michael, Faith
 Def Leppard, Hysteria
 1990 - Milli Vanilli, Girl You Know It's True (Disqualified)
 Paula Abdul, Forever Your Girl
 Fine Young Cannibals, The Raw & the Cooked
 New Kids on the Block, Hangin' Tough
 Traveling Wilburys, Traveling Wilburys Vol. 1
 1991 - MC Hammer, Please Hammer, Don't Hurt 'Em
 AC/DC, The Razors Edge
 Phil Collins, ...But Seriously
 New Kids on the Block, Step by Step
 Sinéad O'Connor, I Do Not Want What I Haven't Got

Best Selling Album by a Foreign Artist (1992)
 1992 - Vanilla Ice, To the Extreme
 C+C Music Factory, Gonna Make You Sweat
 Metallica, Metallica
 Michael Bolton, Time, Love & Tenderness
 AC/DC, The Razors Edge

Best Selling Album (Foreign or Domestic) (1993 - 2002)
 1993 - Bryan Adams, Waking Up the Neighbours
 U2, Achtung Baby
 Tom Cochrane, Mad Mad World
 Nirvana, Nevermind
 Billy Ray Cyrus, Some Gave All
 1994 - Whitney Houston, The Bodyguard
 Meat Loaf, Bat Out of Hell II: Back into Hell
 The Tragically Hip, Fully Completely
 Aerosmith, Get a Grip
 Bon Jovi, Keep the Faith
 1995 - Celine Dion, The Colour of My Love
 Counting Crows, August and Everything After
 The Tragically Hip, Day For Night
 Ace of Base, The Sign
 Pearl Jam, Vs.
 1996 - The Cranberries, No Need to Argue
 Celine Dion, D'eux
 Various Artists, Dangerous Minds
 Eagles, Hell Freezes Over
 Shania Twain, The Woman in Me
 1997 - Celine Dion, Falling into You
 The Smashing Pumpkins, Mellon Collie and the Infinite Sadness
 Mariah Carey, Daydream
 Fugees, The Score
 Oasis, (What's the Story) Morning Glory?
 1998 - Spice Girls, Spice
 Aqua, Aquarium
 Backstreet Boys, Backstreet Boys
 Backstreet Boys, Backstreet's Back
 Our Lady Peace, Clumsy
 1999 - Celine Dion, Let's Talk About Love
 Shania Twain, Come On Over
 Madonna, Ray of Light
 Spice Girls, Spiceworld
 James Horner, Titanic
 2000 - Backstreet Boys, Millennium
 The Offspring, Americana
 Britney Spears, ...Baby One More Time
 Ricky Martin, Ricky Martin
 Celine Dion, These Are Special Times
 2001 - Eminem, The Marshall Mathers LP
 Enrique Iglesias, Enrique
 Creed, Human Clay
 NSYNC, No Strings Attached
 Britney Spears, Oops!... I Did It Again
 2002 - Shaggy, Hot Shot
 U2, All That You Can't Leave Behind
 Backstreet Boys, Black & Blue
 Limp Bizkit, Chocolate Starfish and the Hot Dog Flavored Water
 Destiny's Child, Survivor

International Album of the Year (2003 - Present)

2000s
 2003 - Eminem, The Eminem Show
 Creed, Weathered
 Enrique Iglesias, Escape
 Nelly, Nellyville
 Shakira, Laundry Service
 2004 - 50 Cent, Get Rich or Die Tryin'
 Christina Aguilera, Stripped
 Hilary Duff, Metamorphosis
 Evanescence, Fallen
 Rod Stewart, It Had to Be You: The Great American Songbook
 2005 - Green Day, American Idiot
 Usher, Confessions
 Eminem, Encore
 Norah Jones, Feels Like Home
 U2, How to Dismantle an Atomic Bomb
 2006 - The Black Eyed Peas, Monkey Business and Coldplay, X&Y (Tie)
 Kelly Clarkson, Breakaway
 Gwen Stefani, Love. Angel. Music. Baby.
 50 Cent, The Massacre
 2007 - Dixie Chicks, Taking the Long Way
 Il Divo, Ancora
 Madonna, Confessions on a Dance Floor
 Justin Timberlake, FutureSex/LoveSounds
 Red Hot Chili Peppers, Stadium Arcadium
 2008 - Rihanna, Good Girl Gone Bad
 Fergie, The Dutchess
 Bon Jovi, Lost Highway
 Josh Groban, Noël
 Timbaland, Shock Value
 2009 - Coldplay, Viva la Vida or Death and All His Friends
 AC/DC, Black Ice
 Guns N' Roses, Chinese Democracy
 Metallica, Death Magnetic
 Jack Johnson, Sleep Through the Static

2010s
 2010 - Kings of Leon, Only by the Night
 Britney Spears, Circus
 The Black Eyed Peas, The E.N.D
 Taylor Swift, Fearless
 Susan Boyle, I Dreamed a Dream
 2011 - Katy Perry, Teenage Dream
 Kesha, Animal
 Lady Antebellum, Need You Now
 Eminem, Recovery
 Taylor Swift, Speak Now
 2012 - Adele, 21
 Coldplay, Mylo Xyloto
 Lady Gaga, Born This Way
 LMFAO, Sorry for Party Rocking
 Rihanna, Loud
 2013 - Mumford & Sons, Babel
 Maroon 5, Overexposed
 One Direction, Up All Night
 Rod Stewart, Merry Christmas, Baby
 Taylor Swift, Red
 2014 - Bruno Mars, Unorthodox Jukebox
 Eminem, The Marshall Mathers LP 2
 Imagine Dragons, Night Visions
 One Direction, Take Me Home
 Pink, The Truth About Love
 2015 - Sam Smith, In the Lonely Hour
 Katy Perry, Prism
 Lorde, Pure Heroine
 One Direction, Midnight Memories
 Taylor Swift, 1989
 2016 - Adele, 25
 One Direction, Four
 Hozier, Hozier
 Meghan Trainor, Title
 Vance Joy, Dream Your Life Away
 2017 - Coldplay, A Head Full of Dreams
 Rihanna, Anti
 Sia, This Is Acting
 One Direction, Made in the A.M.
 Ariana Grande, Dangerous Woman
 2018 - Kendrick Lamar, Damn
 Bruno Mars, 24K Magic
 Ed Sheeran, ÷
 Post Malone, Stoney
 Taylor Swift, Reputation
 2019 - Post Malone, Beerbongs & Bentleys
 Camila Cabello, Camila
 Cardi B, Invasion of Privacy
 Maroon 5, Red Pill Blues
 Travis Scott, Astroworld

2020s
 2020 - Billie Eilish, When We All Fall Asleep, Where Do We Go?
 Ariana Grande, Thank U, Next
 Khalid, Free Spirit
 Post Malone, Hollywood's Bleeding
 Ed Sheeran, No.6 Collaborations Project
 2021 - Harry Styles, Fine Line 
Luke Combs, What You See Is What You Get
Eminem, Music to Be Murdered By
Pop Smoke, Shoot for the Stars, Aim for the Moon
Taylor Swift, Folklore
 2022 - Olivia Rodrigo, Sour
Adele, 30
Doja Cat, Planet Her
The Kid Laroi, F*ck Love 3: Over You
Taylor Swift, Evermore
 2023 - Harry Styles, Harry's House
Ed Sheeran, =
Lil Nas X, Montero
Taylor Swift, Red (Taylor's Version)
Taylor Swift, Midnights

References

International Album
Album awards